Anthony Sablan Apuron (born November 1, 1945) is an American prelate of the Roman Catholic Church.  He served as archbishop of the Archdiocese of Agaña in Guam from 1983 until 2016, when the Holy See removed him as archbishop for child sexual abuse crimes.

Biography

Early life 
Apuron was born on November 1, 1945, in Tamuning, Guam, the eighth of ten children of Manuel Taijito Apuron and Ana Santos Sablan. He joined the Capuchin order and was educated at  St. Anthony College in Hudson, New Hampshire, and at the Capuchin Seminary in Garrison, New York. 

Apuron studied at Maryknoll Seminary in Ossining New York,  and at the University of Notre Dame in Notre Dame, Indiana  He is a member of the Neocatechumenal Way.

Apuron was ordained a priest on August 26, 1972, at Dulce Nombre de Maria Cathedral Basilica in Hagåtña, Guam by Archbishop Felixberto Flores. On December 8, 1983, Pope John Paul II appointed Apuron as an auxiliary bishop of the Archdiocese of Agaña.

Same-sex marriage 

In opposition to a bill legalizing same-sex marriage, Apuron wrote a letter in October 2009 complimenting Islamists who punish gay men with death and contrasting them with gay culture, which he described as self-absorbed. It said:

In an April 2015 letter, Apuron wrote:

Sexual abuse allegations 
In 2010, in response to rumors of sexual abuse by clergy, the Archdiocese of Agana invited anyone with information about abuse to report it. It said that "We take the protection of children very seriously" and that the church was ready to provide assistance "as part of the church’s charity and embrace of those suffering and in need."

In November 2014, John C. Toves accused Apuron of molesting Toves' cousin in the early 1980s. In response, Apuron threatened Toves with a defamation lawsuit and refused to meet with him. Toves met instead with the archdiocese's "sexual abuse response coordinator" Larry Claros. Claros announced that there would be no investigation into the allegations because "the policy of the archdiocese on sexual abuse calls for the victim to make a complaint", not a third party.

In 2014, Deacon Stephen Martinez told Apuron that he was violating the church's policy on the investigation of sex abuse accusations.  This involved allegations that predated those made in 2016.  Martinez coordinated an archdiocesan group  tasked with reviewing sexual abuse allegations.  In response to Martinez's criticism, Apuron removed him from the group.  When new accusations emerged in 2016, Martinez said that Apuron protected himself with the church's policies regarding sexual abuse.  He also stated that Apuron's refusal to step down as archbishop while being scrutinized over sexual abuse allegations was a demonstration of "incompetence". In a press release, the archdiocese said that Martinez's statements were "calumny of such magnitude that the only avenue, which we are following, is recourse to the civil and canonical legal processes to address these intentional lies".

On May 17, 2016, Roy Quintanilla, a Hawaii resident and former altar boy at Our Lady of Mt. Carmel Parish in Agat, accused Apuron of molestation. Quintanilla said the abuse had occurred 40 years earlier when he was 12 years old. He claimed to have proof to back up his charges and had friends who had also allegedly been victims of Apuron. The Archdiocese responded by threatening to sue anyone who made such accusations and called them "malicious lies". Quintanilla could not file criminal charges against Apuron due to Guam's statute of limitations. The law prevented anyone who was sexually victimized before the age of 18 from taking legal action against the perpetrator after the victim turned 21. 

On May 28, 2016, Vincent Pereda, a member of the archdiocesan review board and an Apuron appointee, resigned in protest. He stated that "the sexual abuse policy is a flawed policy because of the situation the board is in now... The policy pretty much has the archbishop making all the decisions and determinations when it comes to handling sexual misconduct cases within the archdiocese." Pereda, a clinical social worker and licensed therapist for over 30 years, said he had spoken with Quintanilla, a close relative, and would be willing to vouch for his credibility in court.

On May 31, 2016, Doris Y. Concepcion, an Arizona resident, accused Apuron of sexually abusing her son, Joseph A. Quinata.  She said that Quinata had served as altar boy in Guam at the same time as Quintanilla.  Before Quinata's death in 2005, he told his mother that Apuron had molested him.  After reading Quintanilla's accusations in the news, Concepcion decided to speak out.  In response, the archdiocese gave notice of legal action against her and Quintanilla. 

On June 5, 2016, Pope Francis placed Apuron on leave to deal with the sexual abuse allegations and appointed as apostolic administrator Archbishop Savio Hon Tai-Fai to run the archdiocese.  That same day, Apuron issued a decree declaring the Concerned Catholics of Guam (CCOG) as a "prohibited society" prohibiting Catholics from associating with its members. He accused them with disseminating "fraudulent or otherwise malicious allegations" against him.  CCOG said its purpose was to give members of the laity a voice in the operation of the archdiocese

On June 7, 2016, Walter G. Denton, another former altar boy from Agat, said that Apuron had sexually him in April 1977 when he was age 13. Denton told a radio interviewer that in 2015, he found out that Apuron had molested one of his cousins. Denton then sent a notarized letter describing his experiences to Archbishop Martin Krebs, apostolic delegate to the Pacific Islands, in August 2015. Krebs delivered the letter to the Holy See. A few months later, Bishop Thomas Olmsted assured Denton that the Holy See was investigating his charges. Denton heard nothing more from the Holy See before making his charges public in 2016. Denton's lawyer, David Lujan, stated that other alleged victims of Apuron had also been in touch with him.

Removal and conviction 
In October 2016, the Congregation for the Doctrine of the Faith (CDF) in Rome assigned Cardinal Raymond Burke to preside over Apuron's trial on sex abuse charges in Guam. The other four judges were bishops. On October 31, 2016 Pope Francis replaced his apostolic administrator, Savio Hon Tai-Fai, with Archbishop Coadjutor Michael J. Byrnes.On March 16, 2018, Apuron was found guilty on charges of the sexual abuse of minors by the tribunal. Byrnes was given full authority over the archdiocese, but Apuron retained his title as archbishop pending the outcome of further appeals.

On February 7, 2019, the Apostolic Tribunal of the CDF denied Apuron's appeal.  Following further review, on April 4, 2019, the CDF confirmed the verdict and declared it final, with no further possible appeal. It described Apuron as "guilty of delicts [transgressions] against the Sixth Commandment with minors". The imposed included Apuron's removal from office; a perpetual prohibition from dwelling, even temporarily, in the jurisdiction of the Archdiocese of Agaña; and a perpetual prohibition from his using the insignia attached to the rank of bishop. Apuron was also banned from returning to Catholic property in Guam. 

In August 2019, at least two new sex abuse allegations surfaced against Apuron in lawsuits. Some other clergy who have served in the archdiocese were named as defendants in lawsuits against Apuron as well.

On April 4, 2019, Pope Francis appoints Byrnes as Archbishop of Agaña.  Byrnes stated later that year that Apuron did not leave him any records of the sex abuse allegations, counter to Church law.

On March 23, 2021, US Federal District Judge Frances Tydingco-Gatewood denied Apuron's motion to temporarily halt proceedings in Guam's clergy sex abuse cases. In August 2021, court filings which were made public revealed that Apuron had testified in court to deny a former Father Duenas Memorial School student's allegations that Apuron raped and sexually abused him multiple times in the school year 1994-1995 at the then-archbishop's private residence in Agana Heights.

Notes

References

External links
Roman Catholic Archdiocese of Agaña Official Site

1945 births
American members of the clergy convicted of crimes
Capuchin bishops
Catholic priests convicted of child sexual abuse
Clergy removed from office
Guamanian Roman Catholics
Guamanian Roman Catholic bishops
Living people
Maryknoll Seminary alumni
Neocatechumenal Way
People from Tamuning, Guam
Roman Catholic archbishops of Agaña
University of Notre Dame alumni
Violence against men in North America
Catholic bishops convicted of sexual abuse